This page discusses the rivers and hydrography of the state of Tasmania, Australia.

In the geography of Tasmania, the state  is covered with a network of rivers and lake systems. As an island, all rivers eventually empty into the waters that surround Tasmania. There are four main river systems:
In the south, the Derwent flows from the Central Highlands past Hobart, to the sea at Storm Bay;
In the west, the Gordon River takes the waters of Lake Gordon and Lake Pedder and is joined by the Franklin River before flowing into Macquarie Harbour;
Flowing eastwards and to the south, the Huon River has its headwaters at Scotts Peak Dam on Lake Pedder, and reaches the sea in D'Entrecasteaux Channel; and
Flowing from the north-east, the South Esk, the state's longest river, joins the North Esk at Launceston to create the Tamar.

Compared to the rest of Australia, Tasmania has a very high proportion of wild or undisturbed rivers.

Catchment areas
Major catchments of Tasmania are linked to the major rivers, the most notable being the Derwent.  Catchments by region are:

South west region
 Gordon River

West coast region
 Arthur River
 Pieman River

Major rivers
The following rivers are the longest river systems, by length.

River topography

Rivers that flow towards the Tasman Sea of the South Pacific Ocean

D'Entrecasteaux (Derwent) sub-catchment
Tasman Sea
D'Entrecasteaux Channel
North West Bay 
Browns
Derwent
Hobart
Jordan
Lachlan
Plenty
Puzzle
Back
Styx
Styx (South)
Tyenna
Humboldt
Clyde
Jones
Ouse
Shannon
James
Dee
Broad
Davis
Repluse
Florentine
Florentine (Little)
Nive
Clarence 
Pine
Pine (Little)
Little
Counsel
Navarre
Navarre (Little) 
Travellers Rest
Narcissus
Cuvier

D'Entrecasteaux (Huon) sub-catchment
Tasman Sea
D'Entrecasteaux Channel
Carlton 
Huon
Crookes Rivulet
Kermandie 
Mountain  
Little Denison  
Russell 
Arve 
Weld
Snake   
Picton
Roberts 
Cracroft  
Cracroft (South)
Anne
Ringarooma
Wyniford
Weld
Frome
Cascade
Dorset
New
Maurice
Maurice (South)

Rivers with no defined sub-catchment
Tasman Sea
Ansons
Last
Apsley
Buxton
Catamaran
Coal
D'Entrecasteaux
Douglas
Esperance
George
Groom
Ransom
George (North)
George (South)
Lune
Meredith
North West Bay
Prosser
Sand
Back
Bluff
Scamander
Avenue
Snug
Stony
Swan
Wye
Cygnet
Brushy
Swan (West)
Swanport (Little)
Welcome
Harcus

Rivers that flow towards the Southern Ocean

GordonFranklin sub-catchment
Southern Ocean
Gordon
Spence
Franklin
Jane
Acheron
Andrew
Wright
Looker
Loddon
Adelaide
Loddon (South)
Lucan
Collingwood
Patons
Balaclava
Inkerman
Alma
Surprise
Sprent
Percy
Olga
Denison
Maxwell
Firths
Smith
Orange
Albert
Serpentine 
Adams
Holley
Pokana
Wedge
Boyd
Boyes
Gell

Pieman River sub-catchment
Southern Ocean
Pieman
Donaldson
Toner
Donaldson (Little)
Whyte
Heazlewood
Rocky
Castray
Savage
Savage (Little)
Owen Meredith
Paradise
Heemskirk
Stanley
Huskisson
Ramsay
Que
Bulgobac
Coldstream
Hatfield
Stitt
Wilson
Alfred
Harman
Wilson (Little)
Ring
Marionoak
Murchison
Anthony
Bluff
Achilles
Wallace
Mackintosh
Sophia
Brougham
Southwell
Fury
Mackintosh
Vale

Davey River sub-catchment
Southern Ocean
Davey
De Witt
Crossing
Dodds
Hardwood
Frankland (south-west)
Lora

Henty River sub-catchment
Southern Ocean
Henty
Badger
Yolande
Langdon
Tully
Tully (Little)

King River sub-catchment
Southern Ocean
King
Queen
Thomas Currie
Garfield
Princess
Nelson
Governor
Tofft
Eldon (South)
Eldon

Old River sub-catchment
Southern Ocean
Old 
Collins
Solly
Watts

Wanderer River sub-catchment
Southern Ocean
Wanderer 
Conder
Hales

Rivers with no defined sub-catchment
Southern Ocean
 Birchs
 Bird
 Nora
 Braddon
Clark
Daisy
Dawson
Giblin
Henty (Little)
Dundas
Hibbs
Interview
Italian
Lagoon
Lewis
Hudson
Louisa
Mainwaring
Manuka
Modder
Mulcahy 
Nelson Bay
New
Salisbury
Nielson
Pedder
Pedder (North)
North
Ray
Rocky (Little)
Sorell
Pockacker
Spero
Pery
Spring
 Tasman
 Thornton
 McLeod
 Urquhart
 Wild Wave

Rivers that flow north, towards Bass Strait

EskTamar catchment
Bass Strait
Tamar
Supply
Esk (South)
Meander
Liffey
Macquarie
Lake
Lake (Upper)  
Isis
Elizabeth
Snowy
Blackman
Tooms
Nile
St Pauls
Dukes
Break O'Day
Tyne 
Esk (North)
St Patricks
Ford

Arthur River sub-catchment
Bass Strait
Arthur
Frankland (north-west)
Horton
Grane
Lindsay
Leigh  
Salmon
Julius
Rapid
Rapid (Little)
Lyons
Keith
Hellyer
Wey
Fossey
Wandle
Waratah
Blythe

Inglis River sub-catchment
Bass Strait
Inglis
Flowerdale
Hebe
Calder
Jessie
Rattler

Forth River sub-catchment
Bass Strait
 Forth
 Wilmont
 Lea
 Fall
 Iris
 Dove
 Campbell
 Hansons

Mersey River sub-catchment
Bass Strait
Mersey
 Dasher
 Minnow 
 Fisher
 Fisher (Little)
 Arm
 Fish

Cam River sub-catchment
Bass Strait
 Cam
Guide
Cam (East)
St Marys
St Josephs

Rivers with no defined sub-catchment
Bass Strait
Bird
Bird (Little)
 Black
 Dip
Boobyalla
Boobyalla (Little)
Curries
Detention
Alarm
 Don
 Duck
Roger
 Emu
Old Park
Pet
Darling
Forester (Great)
Arnon
Forester (Little)  
Leven
Gawler
Gawler (East)
Gawler (West)
Medway
Montagu
Musselroe (Great)
Musselroe (Little)
Pipers
Second
Pipers (Little)
Rubicon
Tomahawk

See also

List of rivers of Tasmania

References

 
Lists of landforms of Tasmania